Evans Notch (elev. ) is a mountain pass located in the White Mountains in Maine, United States, about  east of the New Hampshire border. It is the easternmost notch through the White Mountains (the next ones to the west being Carter Notch and Pinkham Notch). To the south, the notch is drained by the Cold River, which leads via the Charles River to the Saco River, which in turn flows into the Gulf of Maine east of Saco and Biddeford. The notch is drained to the north by Evans Brook, a tributary of the Wild River, which flows north to the Androscoggin River. The Androscoggin leads east and south to the Kennebec River at Merrymeeting Bay north of Bath, Maine.

Maine State Route 113 traverses the notch on its route from Fryeburg on the Saco River in the south to Gilead on the Androscoggin River in the north.

The summit of West Royce is in New Hampshire, while East Royce is in Maine. The Royces form the northern end of the Baldface-Royce Range of mountains. To the east of the notch's height of land is Speckled Mountain, elevation .

Numerous hiking trails begin in the notch. To the west, the Royce Trail, Laughing Lion Trail, and East Royce Trail all climb the Royce Mountains, while to the east, the Bickford Brook Trail and Spruce Hill Trail lead onto the Speckled Mountain massif.

See also
List of mountain passes in Maine
List of mountain passes in New Hampshire

References
U.S. Geological Survey 7.5-minute topographic map series: Speckled Mountain, Maine (2012), and Wild River, NH-Maine (2012); viewable at Acme Mapper

Landforms of Oxford County, Maine
Mountain passes of Maine